The IMP Society is a secret society at the University of Virginia that is notable for combining philanthropy and public mischief.

It was founded in 1902 as a society called the Hot Feet. The society was known primarily for its public ceremonies in which it crowned the society's "king". The Hot Feet were disbanded in 1908 under pressure from the university's Administrative Council, who called the society "very detrimental to the University's welfare" and banned it, along with "all other organizations which promote disorder in the 
University." While the society returned, it was to be disbanded once more; university historian Virginius Dabney records the final activity of the society as the 1911 distribution of stuffed animal specimens from the natural history museum about Grounds on Easter Sunday, and the assault of a student in his room.

The society reconstituted itself in 1913 as the IMP Society, and remains active.

The IMP Society has engaged in philanthropic activities around the University, presenting the IMP Award, given "to a faculty member who had been outstanding in promoting student-faculty relations and perpetuating the traditions of the university",  and the IMP Student Athlete Award, given at graduation to a female athlete who has excelled in both the field and the classroom; and a recent student social justice-oriented community service fellowship.

In addition to philanthropy, IMPs are known to march around the grounds carrying pitchforks, wearing horned hoods, and engaging in mild mischief and revelry. (In one 2004 incident, the group was forced to apologize after using gasoline to start a bonfire on the Lawn during a nighttime ceremony.) The society publicly "taps" its new members, and most current members wear a ring indicating their membership in the organization.  While the members of the group are known, many of their community service works are not widely publicized.  Like the Seven Society and Z Society, the IMP Society is known to paint their symbol around university grounds.

Members of the IMP Society are more public than other societies at the university, often recognized by their ring with the face of a devil on it, or their public tappings. Notable IMP and Hot Feet alumni include James Rogers McConnell, who was the inspiration for Gutzon Borglum's statue The Aviator.

See also
 Secret societies at the University of Virginia
Collegiate secret societies in North America

References

1902 establishments in Virginia
Collegiate secret societies
University of Virginia